Fall Gelb: The Fall of France is a 1983 video game published by Simulations Canada.

Gameplay
Fall Gelb is a game in which Germany invades the Netherlands, Belgium, and France during World War II.

Reception
Jay Selover reviewed Grey Seas, Grey Skies and Fall Gelb for Computer Gaming World, and stated that "Both games are good simulations, and appear to be built on well researched data bases. They are both designed in presentation and content for the board gamer who now has a computer and wants to make use of its limited intelligence and rules adjudication abilities."

References

External links

Review in Softalk
Article in Commodore Magazine

1983 video games
Apple II games
Atari ST games
Computer wargames
Simulations Canada video games
Turn-based strategy video games
Video games about Nazi Germany
Video games developed in Canada
Video games set in Belgium
Video games set in France
Video games set in the Netherlands
Works about the Battle of France